Polyacrylamides is a category of polymers whose monomers are acrylamides. Some important examples are:
 Polyacrylamide, the original homologue
 Poly(N-isopropylacrylamide), i.e. the well-known PNIPAM or PNIPAAm